Walter Richardson (24 October 1876 – 30 May 1962) was an Australian cricketer. He played four first-class matches for Tasmania between 1898 and 1912.

See also
 List of Tasmanian representative cricketers

References

External links
 

1876 births
1962 deaths
Australian cricketers
Tasmania cricketers
Cricketers from Hobart